Search is an American science fiction series that aired on Wednesday nights on NBC at 10 pm ET, from September 1972 to August 1973. It ran for 23 episodes, not including the two-hour pilot film originally titled Probe. When picked up for series production, the title had to be changed because Probe was the name of an existing PBS series.
 
In the UK the series aired on BBC1 under the title Search Control.
In Spain the series aired on TVE 1 under the title Investigación (Investigation).
In Italy the series aired under the title 'SEARCH'.

The show was created by Leslie Stevens, and produced by Stevens, Robert H. Justman, John Strong and Anthony Spinner. The high concept was described as "science fiction in today's world" and the episodes featured many high-tech elements which are now considered common in current science fiction shows.

It was called "Operación Rescate" (Rescue Operation) in Argentina.

In Brazil the series aired on TV Globo under the title "Controle Remoto" (Remote Control).



Plot

The series centers on World Securities Corporation, a high-tech international private investigation company that employs field operatives—the elite of whom are aided by implanted audio receivers and who carry Scanners, tiny video camera/telemetry units which can be attached to tie clips or other jewelry.  The most common method is to wear the Scanner on a ring, enabling it to be discreetly aimed.

Each episode features one of three primary agents on a particular investigation, which often have political or organized crime elements.

Search finished in the Nielsen ratings for the 1972 -1973 TV Season with a 14.6 Average Audience. It was rated #63 out of #75 shows for that season.

Cast
Search was featured in the November 1972 edition of TV Guide, with an illustration of the three actors playing the show's "Probes" on the cover.

Probe field agents
Hugh O'Brian as Hugh Lockwood, Probe One - Lead Operative (8 episodes and pilot)
Tony Franciosa as Nick Bianco, Head of Omega division, which specializes in organized-crime cases (8 episodes)
Doug McClure as C.R. Grover, standby Probe - emergency backup agent (7 episodes)

Probe control staff
 Burgess Meredith as V.C.R. Cameron, Director of Probe Control Unit 1
 Tom Hallick as Harris, Deputy Director of Probe Control Unit 1 
 Angel Tompkins as Gloria Harding, senior medical technician monitoring pulse, respiration, and temperature
 Albert Popwell as Albert Griffin, linguist and code-breaker; former chief translator at the United Nations
 Byron Chung as Kuroda, telemetry and electronics specialist
 Amy Farrell as Amy Murdock, medical doctor
 Ginny Golden as Ginny Keach, data specialist
 Ron Castro as Carlos Lobos, technician

Probe Control
Probe agents reported to V.C.R. Cameron (Burgess Meredith), the "director" of the investigations, who ran Probe Control, a center reminiscent of the NASA Mission Control Center.  "Cam" was the leader of the expert team who monitored and provided the agent with intelligence.

On-duty experts included a translator fluent in several languages, and a medical-telemetry specialist.

Early in the series the Probe Control set was placed in a darkened isolated space, alluding to a large-scale operations center. By the middle of the season, the control room was scaled down and relocated to a well-lit but smaller "bunker" room.  According to the show's credits, the computer equipment was provided by Control Data Corporation.

Two modern, futuristic buildings were shown as the headquarters for World Securities Corporation.  In the pilot movie, 555 California Street in San Francisco was used.  This building, completed just a few years earlier in 1969, was once the headquarters building for Bank of America.  In the TV series, World Securities headquarters was 600 Commonwealth Avenue in Los Angeles.  This is actually the Central Civil West Courthouse, which belongs to the Central Judicial District of Los Angeles.

Probe hardware
Each field agent is outfitted with a miniature scanner disguised as a piece of jewelry, which can be magnetically attached to special cuff links, tie clips, rings or pendants. This device continuously monitors the agent's progress, transmitting audio, video, and physical telemetry to Probe Control.  These images were stabilized and rotated to permit real-time observation by a team of specialists at Probe Control who analyze the data, consult databases worldwide, and immediately provide information covertly to the field agent via a subcutaneous ear piece (or "earjack") implanted in the agent's mastoid process. (First-generation earjacks had platinum housings, later replaced with zirconium for unspecified reasons.) The agent can respond to Probe Control either audibly (via the microphone in the scanner) or by tapping out code with a dental implant, even when they don't have their scanner operating.

The technology portrayed in the show was twenty to thirty years ahead of its time, and some of the technology was difficult for the viewers to identify with.

Search finished in the Nielsen ratings for the 1972 -1973 TV Season with a 14.6 Average Audience. It was rated #61 out of #75 shows for that season.

Episode list

Home media
On February 4, 2014, Warner Bros. released Search: The Complete Series on DVD in Region 1, via their Warner Archive Collection.

References

External links
 
 
Search at tvparty.com
Search at Television Obscurities

1970s American science fiction television series
1972 American television series debuts
1973 American television series endings
NBC original programming
Television series by Warner Bros. Television Studios
Television shows set in London